Arvind Panagariya (born 30 September 1952) is an Indian-American economist who is the Jagdish Bhagwati Professor of Indian Political Economy at  Columbia University and is also the Director of Deepak and Neera Raj Center on Indian Economic Policies at School of International and Public Affairs at Columbia University in New York City. He served as first vice-chairman of the government of India think-tank NITI Aayog between January 2015 and August 2017. He is a former Chief Economist of the Asian Development Bank. He was awarded the Padma Bhushan by the President of India in 2012 for his contributions in the field of economics and Public Policy. He is an authority on free trade and widely regarded as the foremost expert in the world on Indian economy.

He is the brother of noted neurologist and medical researcher Dr. Ashok Panagariya.

Career 
He holds a Ph.D in economics from Princeton University under the doctoral supervision of Peter Kenen and William Hoban Branson He was the Professor of economics and Co-director of Center for International Economic at the University of Maryland at College Park from 1978 to 2003 (where one of his doctoral students included economist Joseph Francois). He currently serves as the Jagdish Bhagwati Professor of Indian Political Economy at Columbia University and is also the Director of Deepak and Neera Raj Center on Indian Economic Policies at School of International and Public Affairs at Columbia University in New York City.

He was previously Chief Economist at the Asian Development Bank. He has worked for the World Bank, International Monetary Fund, World Trade Organization and the United Nations Conference on Trade and Development (UNCTAD).He served as an Adviser to the Board of US-India Strategic Partnership Forum (USISPF).

He was a Non-resident Senior Fellow, Brookings Institution, Washington DC. He was a member of an Independent Taskforce on South Asia and India sponsored by Centre for Foreign Relations, New York.

He has served as a member of International Advisory Board, Securities and Exchange Board of India(SEBI).  He served as a Member of Board of Governors of Indian Council for Research on International Economic Relations (ICRIER). He was also a member of Committee on the Center on Advanced Financial Research and Learning (CAFRL) appointed by the Governor, Reserve bank of India (RBI).

His book Why Growth Matters, co-authored with Jagdish Bhagwati, won the coveted Eccles Prize for Excellence in Economic Writing and was listed as the best book of the year by the Financial Times. The Economist  described this book as “a manifesto for policymakers and analysts.” His other works include India: The Emerging Giant, published in 2008. It was described as the ‘definitive book on the Indian economy’ by Fareed Zakaria. He frequently collaborates and co authors research papers and books with noted economist Dr. Jagdish Bhagwati.

He was the Founding Editor of the journal-India Policy Forum launched in 2004 by the Brookings Institution and the National Council of Applied Economic Research (NCAER).

He is also the founding editor of the Journal of Policy Reform, which he edited with Dani Rodrik during 1996-2001. He is currently an Associate Editor of Economics and Politics and the Journal of International Trade and Economic Development.

Papers written by him for the World Bank and IMF usually promote the idea of trade liberalisation and privatization of state owned enterprises of India for an investment and exports driven economic growth.

He has appeared on Bloomberg TV India for the show "Transforming India With Arvind Panagriya" He writes a monthly column in the Times of India and his guest columns appear in the Financial Times, Wall Street Journal and India Today.

He was awarded the Padma Bhushan by the President of India in 2012 for his contributions in the field of economics and Public Policy.   

On 5 Jan 2015, he was appointed Vice-Chairman of the National Institution for Transforming India (NITI) Aayog, the replacement for the Planning Commission. He was appointed as India's Sherpa for G20 talks in September 2015. Panagariya was also heading analysis of the data of the Socio Economic and Caste Census 2011.

He gave his resignation as Niti Aayog Vice-Chairman stating that Columbia University has not extended his leave beyond 31 August 2017.

See also
 Indians in the New York City metropolitan area

References

External links
 Arvind Panagariya bio at Niti Aayog

Living people
University of Rajasthan alumni
Princeton University alumni
University of Maryland, College Park faculty
Columbia University faculty
Recipients of the Padma Bhushan in literature & education
1952 births
21st-century Indian economists
American academics of Indian descent
Indian economists